Salvatore Gallo (born 20 August 1992) is an Italian footballer who plays for Nuorese as a defensive midfielder.

In 2012, he was signed by Lumezzane.

In summer 2013 he was signed by Venezia in co-ownership deal. In June 2014 Chievo bought back Gallo.

References

External links
  
 
 
 

1992 births
Living people
Association football midfielders
Italian footballers
Serie C players
F.C. Lumezzane V.G.Z. A.S.D. players
Venezia F.C. players